Rhamnus serrata, the sawleaf buckthorn, is a species of plant in the family Rhamnaceae. The shrub is native to Arizona, New Mexico, eastern northern Mexico, and Texas.

References

External links
  USDA Plants Profile for Rhamnus serrata (sawleaf buckthorn)

serrata
Flora of Arizona
Flora of New Mexico
Flora of Northeastern Mexico
Flora of Texas
Taxa named by Carl Ludwig Willdenow